Jaime Robles Céspedes (born 2 February 1978) is a Bolivian football midfielder who currently plays for Aurora in the Liga de Fútbol Profesional Boliviano.

His former clubs include San José, Destroyers, La Paz F.C., Universitario de Sucre and Blooming.

National team
Between 2008 and 2011 Robles played in 26 games representing Bolivia .

Club titles

References
 
 

1978 births
Living people
2011 Copa América players
Association football midfielders
Bolivian footballers
Bolivia international footballers
Club Aurora players
Club Blooming players
Club Destroyers players
Club San José players
People from Obispo Santistevan Province